Eodorcadion jakovlevi is a species of beetle in the family Cerambycidae. It was described by Suvorov in 1912.

Subspecies
 Eodorcadion jakovlevi fangzhoui Lin & Danilevsky, 2011
 Eodorcadion jakovlevi jakovlevi (Suvorov, 1912)

References

Dorcadiini
Beetles described in 1912